Setalidius is a genus of beetles in the family Carabidae, containing the following species:

 Setalidius attenuatus Fauvel, 1882
 Setalidius nigerrimus Chaudoir, 1878

References

Pterostichinae